The Oberliga Nord was the highest level of the German football league system in the north of Germany from 1947 until the formation of the Bundesliga in 1963. It covered the states of Lower Saxony, Bremen, Hamburg and Schleswig-Holstein.

Overview
The league was created in 1947 as the highest level of football in the north of Germany, then part of the British occupation zone. It replaced the various Gauligas, which had existed until 1945 in the region:
 Gauliga Braunschweig-Südhannover
 Gauliga Hamburg
 Gauliga Osthannover
 Gauliga Schleswig-Holstein
 Gauliga Weser-Ems

It was, together with the Oberliga West, the last of the five Oberligas to be formed, the other four being:

Oberliga West (formed in 1947)
Oberliga Berlin (formed in 1945, originally with clubs from West and East Berlin until 1950)
Oberliga Südwest (formed in 1945)
Oberliga Süd (formed in 1945)

The league was formed from twelve clubs in 1947, four from Hamburg, three from Lower Saxony (South), three from Lower Saxony (North, incorporating Bremen at the time) and two from Schleswig-Holstein.

With the reintroduction of the German championship in 1948, the winners and (in most cases) runners-up of the Oberliga Nord went on to the finals tournament with the other Oberliga champions. In 1950, when 16 clubs were admitted, VfL Osnabrück competed as well, having finished 3rd in the North. In 1954, runners-up FC St.Pauli did not qualify because the number of participants was reduced to six clubs. In the period from 1948 to 1963, only two teams from the north of Germany won the national title, Hannover 96 (1954) and Hamburger SV (1960).

The league was completely dominated by Hamburger SV, who won it 15 out of 16 times, failing in 1954 only by finishing eleventh (the position influenced to some extent by a deduction of four points).

Unlike the other Oberligas, the Oberliga Nord never formed a 2nd Oberliga as the second tier, the five local Amateurligas remained at this level instead.

Reforming of the Oberliga Nord
In 1974, with the disbanding of the Regionalliga Nord, the Oberliga Nord was re-created, but now as the third tier of German football. Geographically, it covered the same region as the old Oberliga Nord.

Founding members of the Oberliga Nord
Hamburger SV
FC St. Pauli
Eintracht Braunschweig
VfL Osnabrück
Werder Bremen
Arminia Hannover
VfB Lübeck
Concordia Hamburg
Bremer SV
Holstein Kiel
Hannover 96
SC Victoria Hamburg

Disbanding of the Oberliga
With the introduction of the new Bundesliga, the Oberligas were disbanded. The top three teams of the Oberliga Nord were admitted to the Bundesliga, the other thirteen clubs went to the Regionalliga Nord, one of the five new second divisions.

Admitted to Bundesliga:

Hamburger SV
SV Werder Bremen
Eintracht Braunschweig

The following teams from the Oberliga went to the new Regionalliga:

VfR Neumünster
Holstein Kiel
FC St. Pauli
VfL Osnabrück
VfV Hildesheim
Hannover 96
Arminia Hannover
ASV Bergedorf 85
VfB Oldenburg
TuS Bremerhaven 93
Concordia Hamburg
FC Altona 93
VfB Lübeck

Qualifying for the Bundesliga
The qualifying system for the new league was fairly complex. The league placings of the clubs playing in the Oberligen for the last ten seasons were taken into consideration, whereby results from 1952 to 1955 counted once, results from 1955 to 1959 counted double and results from 1959 to 1963 triple. A first-place finish was awarded 16 points, a sixteenth place one point. Appearances in the German championship or DFB-Pokal finals were also rewarded with points. The five Oberliga champions of the 1962-63 season were granted direct access to the Bundesliga. All up, 46 clubs applied for the 16 available Bundesliga slots.

Following this system, by 11 January 1963, the DFB announced nine fixed clubs for the new league and reduced the clubs eligible for the remaining seven places to 20. Clubs within the same Oberliga that were separated by less than 50 points were considered on equal rank and the 1962-63 placing was used to determine the qualified team.

Eight clubs applied for Bundesliga membership, of those Hamburger SV and Werder Bremen qualified early (11 January 1963). The third place went to Eintracht Braunschweig due to their third-place finish in 1962–63 even though their overall points put them in seventh spot in the ranking, but within 50 points of third-placed VfL Osnabrück. Osnabrück finished seventh in 1962-63.

Points table:

 Source: DSFS Liga-Chronik , page: B 11, accessed: 4 November 2008
 Bold Denotes club qualified for the new Bundesliga.
 1 Denotes club was one of the nine selected on 11 January 1963.
 2 Denotes club was one of the 20 taken into final selection.
 3 Denotes club was one of the 15 applicants which were removed from final selection.
 4 Denotes club withdrew Bundesliga application.

Honours
The winners and runners-up of the Oberliga Nord:

 Bold denotes team went on to win German Championship.

Placings & all-time table of the Oberliga Nord
The final placings and all-time table of the Oberliga Nord:

Source:

Table includes results from the finals rounds of the German championship.

See also
 Verbandsliga Norddeutschland

References

Sources
 Kicker Almanach,  The yearbook on German football from Bundesliga to Oberliga, since 1937, published by the Kicker Sports Magazine
 Die Deutsche Liga-Chronik 1945-2005  History of German football from 1945 to 2005 in tables, publisher: DSFS, published: 2006

External links
 Das deutsche Fussball Archiv  Historic German league tables
 Oberliga Nord at Fussballdaten.de  

Nord
Football competitions in Bremen (state)
Football competitions in Hamburg
Football competitions in Lower Saxony
Football competitions in Schleswig-Holstein
1947 establishments in Germany
1963 disestablishments in Germany
Sports leagues established in 1947
Ger